Pierce Edward Swope (August 15, 1884 — December 9, 1968) was an American German Reformed clergyman and prominent author in the Pennsylvania German language. Swope was born in Meckville, Pennsylvania (Berks County), and was a graduate of Lebanon Valley College and Ursinus College. He was ordained on July 31, 1913. His dialect pseudonym was Der Kaspar Hufnagel; beginning in 1947, he used this name over a weekly Pennsylvania German column for the Lebanon Daily News. He also wrote "Was Saagt Der ... Kaspar Hufnagel" for the Ephrata Ensign from 1948 to 1951. Swope was the first person formally licensed to teach Pennsylvania German in public schools.

Swope married Carrie M. Hauer on January 6, 1906, in Hamlin, Pennsylvania and  received an honorary doctor of divinity degree from Ursinus in 1940. He died in Annville, Pennsylvania and is buried in Hamlin.

Bibliography
Pennsylvania Dutch Essays and Poems (1968)
Earl C. Haag, A Pennsylvania German Anthology (1988)

References
Obituary, Lebanon Daily News, December 9, 1968, pp. 1–2.
Obituary, The Morning Call, December 10, 1968, p. 12.

External links
Pierce E. Swope Pennsylvania German Newspaper Columns and Poetry Scrapbooks, 1906-1962 at Penn State
Grave at Klopps Cemetery, Lebanon County

1884 births
1968 deaths
German-American history
Pennsylvania Dutch people
United Church of Christ ministers
United Church of Christ in Pennsylvania
American writers in Pennsylvania Dutch
Pennsylvania Dutch culture
German language in the United States
Lebanon Valley College alumni
Ursinus College alumni
Journalists from Pennsylvania